Indium bromide may refer to:

 Indium(I) bromide, InBr
 Indium(III) bromide, InBr3; when molten it is dimeric, In2Br6, and it is predominantly dimeric in the gas phase